Bolu Göynük power station (also known as Aksa Göynuk TES) is a 270-megawatt coal-fired power station in Turkey in Göynük, Bolu Province, which burns lignite.

References

External links 

 Bolu Göynük power station on Global Energy Monitor

Coal-fired power stations in Turkey
Göynük District
2015 establishments in Turkey
Buildings and structures in Bolu Province